Tsvetochnoye is a rural locality (a selo) in Gmelinskoye Rural Settlement, Staropoltavsky District, Volgograd Oblast, Russia. The population was 89 as of 2010. There are 2 streets.

Geography 
Tsvetochnoye is located in steppe, on Transvolga, on the left bank of the Kuba River, 35 km southeast of Staraya Poltavka (the district's administrative centre) by road. Gmelinka is the nearest rural locality.

References 

Rural localities in Staropoltavsky District